A climbing route is a path by which a climber reaches the top of a mountain, rock, or ice wall.  Routes can vary dramatically in difficulty and grade; once committed to that ascent, it can sometimes be difficult to stop or return.  Choice of route can be critically important.  Guidebooks, if available, are helpful in providing detailed diagrams and photographs of routes.

In the earliest days of hillwalking and mountaineering, climbers got to the top by whatever means got them there.  Little information about how they did it is available.  During the 19th century, as explorers of the Alps tried ever harder summits, it became clear that choosing an eastern face over a southwestern ridge could spell the difference between success or failure.  One example was the first ascent of the Matterhorn, which had been repeatedly and unsuccessfully attempted via the southern side.  The strata there tended to slope down and away while the rocks of the northeastern ridge (the one closest to Zermatt) tilted up - a steeper, but safer route.

As technique developed, and mountains of the world were ascended via easy routes, climbers began to challenge themselves by looking for and trying harder routes.  Once all the obvious lines had been tried, climbers looked for more technically challenging routes (e.g. an all-rock route threading between icefields or a single thin, fissure running in a continuous straight line from base to summit).  An aesthetic element came in, as well.  An easy, but confusing route, weaving back and forth across a face was less desirable than a direct route along a scenic ridge.  Safe routes that yielded to good technique were more desirable than routes with loose rock and awkward climbing.

Climbing routes that were overlooked or required greater technical skill became associated with the climber(s) who first climbed them.  It became common practice for the first climber to choose a name for the route.  Inevitably, there were climbers so energetic that they established multiple routes on a single mountain or cliff, and named routes based on a theme.  This opened up a new outlet for creative overkill.  Some climbing areas have a bewildering variety of curious and amusing names for their many routes, as seen in the list below.

An example of interesting route-naming can be seen on the Southeast face of El Capitan in Yosemite Valley. The Nose was the first route on the main part of the cliff, so called because it is shaped like a  nose.  A list of routes to the right of The Nose includes:
 New Dawn
 Wall of the Early Morning Light
 Mescalito
 Hockey Night in Canada
 Pacific Ocean Wall (just to the left of a large pattern that looks vaguely like a map of North America)
 Sea of Dreams
 North American Wall
 Wyoming Sheep Ranch (crosses the "Wyoming" of the pattern)
 New Jersey Turnpike
 Atlantic Ocean Wall
 Born Under a Bad Sign
 Bad to the Bone
 Zodiac
 Atlantis
 Eagle's Way
 On the Waterfront
 Waterfall Route
 Chinese Water Torture
 East Buttress (one of the earliest, dating from 1953)

Names often incorporate puns or pop-culture references.  For example, in Joshua Tree National Park, route names include Coarse and Buggy, Cranking Skills or Hospital Bills ("cranking" being the use of upper-body strength), Rockwork Orange (after A Clockwork Orange), Fist Full of Crystals (from A Fistful of Dollars), and Dangling Woo Li Master (from The Dancing Wu Li Masters).

Another reason for the large number of named routes is the desire to indicate precisely where routes go.  For high mountain routes, rockfall and snowfall would significantly change the mountain landscape over the years such that it is only possible to give a general idea of a route (i.e. "Climb the southeast ridge to the black tower, pass below it on the right side, and go up a snow-filled gully to the summit ridge").

Established rock climbing routes are more predictable, and good descriptions help keep climbers on-route and out of trouble. For example, an incorrect choice of a crack could leave the climber stranded in a very precarious position.  Guidebooks, if available, can be helpful in showing routes drawn over photographs or a topographic diagram ("topo" for short) showing a view of the climbing route with specialized symbols indicating important characteristics of the route, and marking helpful climbing gear such as pitons and bolts. For routes longer than the climbing rope (usually about 60 meters), a good topo will also indicate the recommended belay stations.

See also 
 Grade (climbing)
 First ascent
 Notable first free ascents

References 

 Best Time to Climb Kilimanjaro